Lieutenant Henry Bull (1799) was an early settler in the Swan River Colony.

He entered the Royal Navy in December 1813, and served in the West Indies and South America. He retired as a Lieutenant in 1829, and the following year he arrived in Western Australia. He took up land grants on the Canning River in the area now known as Bull Creek; and he was one of the pioneer settlers of the Upper Swan district, with land in what is now the suburb of Bullsbrook.

Bull was the local magistrate of the Upper Swan district for many years. He and George Fletcher Moore are credited with the establishment and maintenance of friendly relations with the indigenous people of the area.

In April 1835, Bull accompanied Moore on an expedition to the north of the Swan River.  The following year he was appointed temporary captain of the colonial schooner Champion, which had just been purchased. In 1838 he was Government Resident at Bunbury, and he was a Member of the Executive Council in 1841. In 1848 he appointed agents to manage his affairs and apparently left the colony.  He is thought to have died shortly afterwards.

References

Morawa District Historical Society – mention of Bull's partnership with George Leake in Ellensbrook
Morawa District Historical Society  - further detail on Ellensbrook partnership and location of the property
RAAF Pearce Airbase history

Further reading
 

Royal Navy officers
Explorers of Western Australia
Settlers of Western Australia
1799 births
1840s deaths
Bull Creek, Western Australia